Carousel is an album by Swedish singer and rapper Leila K, released in 1993.

Track listing 
 "Carousel" (Denniz PoP, Douglas Carr, Deep Fried, Al Agami) 6:08
 "Open Sesame" (Denniz PoP, Douglas Carr, Deep Fried) 8:49
 "Ça Plane Pour Moi" (Lou Deprijck, Yvan Lacomblez) 5:47
 "Slow Motion" (Denniz PoP, Douglas Carr, Deep Fried, Al Agami) 4:00
 "Glam!" (Denniz PoP, Douglas Carr, Deep Fried) 3:43
 "Check the Dan" (Denniz PoP, Douglas Carr, Deep Fried, Leila K) 5:22
 "Pyramid" (Deep Fried, Al Agami, Vito Ingrosso) 4:34
 "Massively Massive" (Denniz PoP, Douglas Carr, Deep Fried, Al Agami) 4:22
 "Close Your Eyes" (Denniz PoP, Douglas Carr, Chuck Anthony, Deep Fried, Leila K) 3:20
 "Open Sesame" (Last Exit Remix) 4:23
 "Ca plane pour moi" (Felix Remix) 7:12

Charts

References 

https://web.archive.org/web/20050214061602/http://tihlde.org/~ivara/leilak/carousel.html

1993 albums
Leila K albums